Guryevsky (masculine), Guryevskaya (feminine), or Guryevskoye (neuter) is the name of several rural localities in Russia:
Guryevskaya, Arkhangelsk Oblast, a village in Lyakhovsky Selsoviet of Krasnoborsky District of Arkhangelsk Oblast
Guryevskaya, Vologda Oblast, a village in Nizhneslobodsky Selsoviet of Vozhegodsky District of Vologda Oblast